The Reinhard-Süring Plaque is a science prize of the German Meteorological Society. It is awarded to personalities who have earned themselves outstanding scientific and organizational contributions to the objectives of the DMG (or its predecessors). Concomitant ceremony to multiple personalities is allowed.

The plaque recalls Reinhard Süring, one of the most important forecasters in the first half of the 20th century. It was the first time in 1967 the Meteorological Society of the GDR awarded.

Winners include Hans Ertel (1969), Karl-Heinz Bernhardt (1978 and 1989), Günter Skeib (1984), Wolfgang Böhme (1986), Christian-Dietrich Schönwiese (2007), Cornelia Lüdecke (2010), Hartmut Grassl (2010) and Hans von Storch (2015).

See also

 List of meteorology awards

External links
Website of the prize at the German Meteorological Society
List of support of Reinhard-Süring Plaque (2015) (PDF; 138 kB) on the website of the German Meteorological Society

Suring, Reinhard